Vadpatak is the Hungarian name for two villages in Romania:

 Valea Vadului village, Iara Commune, Cluj County (Vádpatak)
 Băteşti village, Făget Town, Timiș County (Vadpatak)